Painscastle was, from 1894 to 1974, a rural district in the administrative county of Radnorshire, Wales.

The district was formed by the Local Government Act 1894, when the existing Hay Rural Sanitary District was divided into three: the section in Breconshire was reconstituted as Hay Rural District, the area in Herefordshire became Bredwardine Rural District, while the parishes in Radnorshire became Painscastle Rural District. The new district took its name from the ancient hundred of Painscastle. The council continued to be based in Hay on Wye in Breconshire.

The rural district comprised nine civil parishes: 
Boughrood
Bryngwyn
Cleiro
Glasbury
Llanddewi Fach
Llandeilo Graban
Llanstephan
Llowes
Painscastle

The district was abolished in 1974 under the Local Government Act 1972, which completely reorganised local administration in England and Wales. Its area became part of the District of Radnor in the new county of Powys.

References

Rural districts of Wales
History of Radnorshire
Radnorshire